Aulonemia cochabambensis is a species of Aulonemia bamboo. 
The species is part of the grass family and is endemic to Latin America.

References

cochabambensis